BnF, MS lat. 10536 is a Book of Hours held in Paris’ Bibliothèque nationale de France. Produced in Picardy in the 15th century, the codex is notable for being one of a small handful of extant early cordiform (heart-shaped) manuscript books.

Description
Copied on paper, and measuring approximately 175 × 100 mm, the 151 folio codex contains a calendar (ff. 1r–8r), followed by the Hours of the Use of Amiens, the likely place of its production. Written in Latin, the text is ornamented with enlarged initials, some decorated with penwork. The codex is bound in red Morocco stamped with the arms of Philippe de Béthune.

Provenance
The Bibliothèque nationale de France purchased the book from M. de Bure, bookseller, in 1824. The sale of the collection of the famous Parisian bookseller and bibliophile Charles Chardin took place in February and March of that year at Hôtel Bullion, Paris; the manuscript had been lot number 155 in the sale.

See also
 Book of Hours 
 Chansonnier Cordiforme 
 Heart Book

References

External links
 A black-and-white microfilm of the codex can be viewed via Gallica.

15th-century books
Bibliothèque nationale de France collections
Cordiform manuscripts
Latin manuscripts